DL Jones may refer to:

 Darwin Jones (soccer), also called Darwin L. Jones
 David L. Jones (botanist)
 David L. Jones (electronics engineer)

See also
List of people with surname Jones